Gun TV was an American shopping channel that allowed buyers to purchase firearms through the traditional home shopping television format. By coincidence and with some accompanying criticism, the network's launch announcement came out around the same time as the San Bernardino shootings occurred.

The network mainly operated through a website live stream, along with an overnight over-the-air feed carried by networks such as the American Sports Network's 24/7 service, Tuff TV, Pursuit Channel and FightTV. However, the concept proved to be unsuccessful, and the network ended their operations on January 9, 2017, only nine months after their April 1, 2016 launch. They continued to air hour-long paid programming blocks overnights on Pursuit Channel of a pre-announced model's demonstration after that date until mid-April 2017, when the company's social media accounts went dormant, with its website following soon after.

Business model
Unlike other shopping channels, Gun TV would not ship any products directly to customers in order to comply with Bureau of Alcohol, Tobacco, Firearms and Explosives regulations; instead, the customer would pick up their purchase at the nearest federally licensed dealer, which completed the necessary NICS background checks and paperwork. The firearms were shipped to the dealer via Louisiana-based wholesaler Sports South.

As it is illegal to fire a weapon inside a studio in California, Gun TV featured inactive weapons and unloaded firearms in the studio, combined with out-of-studio demonstrations of the firearms with former law enforcement and military personnel, along with popular markspersons, such as ex-Olympic shooters and contestants from the History competitive shooting series Top Shot among those showing off the features of the offered weaponry.

References

Links
 Gun TV official website
 Gun TV out of ammo after less than year on air // USA Today, Jan 12, 2017

2016 establishments in California
2017 disestablishments in California
Television networks in the United States
Shopping networks in the United States
Coachella Valley
English-language television stations in the United States
Television channels and stations established in 2016
Television channels and stations disestablished in 2017